The Cozens Ranch House in Fraser, Colorado was built by William (Billy) Cozens, sheriff of Central City after he married Mary York. Mary insisted that they leave the wild mining town, so the Cozens family relocated to Grand County, where they started a ranch in 1874. The homestead was the first in the Fraser Valley. The original two-story ranch house was constructed in 1874. A stagecoach stop was added in 1876, where travelers coming up Berthoud Pass could stop for a hot meal or a room for the night.

Mary Cozens willed the property to the Jesuits at Regis College who renamed the property "Maryvale" and use it as a summer retreat from the 1920s to the 1980s.

Cozens Ranch Museum 
In the early 1990s, the Jesuits gave the property to the Grand County Historical Association who then restored it to its 1870s conditions. It opened to the public in 1991 and has been continuously operated as a museum. The museum itself has twelve rooms of exhibits focusing on local history topics.

It is currently the only history museum in the Winter Park-Fraser Area.

The Cozens Ranch was placed on the National Register of Historic Places on June 9, 1988.

See also
National Register of Historic Places listings in Grand County, Colorado

References

External links
 Grand County Historical Association

Houses on the National Register of Historic Places in Colorado
Ranches in Colorado
Museums in Grand County, Colorado
Houses completed in 1874
Houses in Grand County, Colorado
Historic house museums in Colorado
National Register of Historic Places in Grand County, Colorado